Pagwa may refer to:
Pagwa (festival), an Indian spring festival
Pagwa River, Ontario, a community in Cochrane District, Ontario, Canada
RCAF Station Pagwa, a former Royal Canadian Air Force station near Pagwa River
 Pagwa (HBC vessel), operated by the HBC from 1923 to 1924, see Hudson's Bay Company vessels